Steenbeekdries is an uphill cobbled road in the municipality of Maarkedal, in the Belgian province of East Flanders. With its top at 69 m altitude, it is one of many hill formations in the Flemish Ardennes, in the south of East-Flanders. The entire road is paved in cobbles; in 1995 the road of the Steenbeekdries was classified as a protected landscape monument.

Cycling
The site is best known from road bicycle racing, as it regularly features in the spring classics, most notably the Tour of Flanders. The 800 m climb immediately follows the Mariaborrestraat, a long flat sector of cobbles, and at 7.6% average gradient, is not very steep. The descent following the climb, the Stationsberg, is a straight poorly-paved cobbled road and in fact steeper than the Steenbeekdries.

The Steenbeekdries was first included in the Tour of Flanders route in 2002 and has remained a fixed location in the race. In recent years, it comes at 39 km from the finish in Oudenaarde, usually the first climb after the notorious Koppenberg.

The Steenbeekdries is also regularly included in Dwars door Vlaanderen and the Tour of Flanders for Women.

References

External links
 Steenbeekdries Trajectory on Google Maps

Climbs in cycle racing in Belgium
Tour of Flanders
Mountains and hills of East Flanders
Cobbled streets